Mixed team

Oscar Charles Friede (July 14, 1882 – February 14, 1943) was an American tug of war athlete who competed in the 1904 Summer Olympics. He died in St. Louis, Missouri. In the 1904 Olympics he won a bronze medal as a member of Southwest Turnverein of Saint Louis No. 2 team, which is officially considered a mixed team.

References

External links
profile

1882 births
1943 deaths
Olympic bronze medalists for the United States in tug of war
Olympic tug of war competitors of the United States
Tug of war competitors at the 1904 Summer Olympics
Medalists at the 1904 Summer Olympics